Graham Clark (born 1941 in Lancashire, England) is an English opera tenor, mainly known for his character roles like Loge (Das Rheingold), Mime (Siegfried) and the Captain (Wozzeck). He has sung at The Royal Opera House Covent Garden, English National Opera, Glyndebourne Festival Opera, Opera North, Scottish Opera, and Welsh National Opera and Northern Ireland Opera in the UK, all the leading North American and European opera houses, including the Metropolitan Opera New York (15 seasons) and the Bayreuth Festival (16 seasons) and he has recorded for all the major companies.

Clark studied at Kirkham Grammar School - where he was Captain of School - Loughborough College of Education and Loughborough University.  After a few years as a PE teacher, followed by postgraduate studies and then as a Senior Regional Officer of the Sports Council, he took up singing.  His big break came when he was selected by Richard Bonynge to appear in a charity gala at The Royal Opera House, Covent Garden on 25 January 1975 with Joan Sutherland, Heather Begg, Clifford Grant and others in aid of the Australian city of Darwin, recently devastated by Cyclone Tracy. The concert was televised and issued on LP by Decca as 'Darwin: Song for a City'. In 1975 he joined Scottish Opera, was a Principal with English National Opera from 1977 to 1985 and has had an extensive international career from 1976 to 2019.  He has been nominated three times for Outstanding Individual Achievement in Opera Awards, including an Emmy nomination for his role in the premiere production of John Corigliano's The Ghosts of Versailles at the Metropolitan Opera in 1991-1992  and won the Olivier Award for Outstanding Achievement in Opera in 1986 for his role as Mephistopheles in Doktor Faust.
He was awarded an Honorary Doctor of Letters by Loughborough University in 1999.

References

External links
Graham Clark's Official Website
"I Simply Switched Hobbies". Wagneropera.net interview with Graham Clark
Graham Clark's biography - Bayreuth Festival website
Interview with Graham Clark by Bruce Duffie, January 23, 1992
Colbert Artists Management Inc.

1941 births
Living people
People from Littleborough, Greater Manchester
English operatic tenors
Laurence Olivier Award winners
Alumni of Loughborough University
People educated at Kirkham Grammar School
20th-century British male opera singers
21st-century British male opera singers
Musicians from Lancashire